Charlie Fuller McNutt, Jr (born February 27, 1931) is a bishop in The Episcopal Church who served as Bishop of Central Pennsylvania between 1982 and 1995.

Biography
McNutt was born in Charleston, West Virginia on February 27, 1931, the son of Charlie Fuller McNutt and Mary Ford. He graduated with a B.A. from Washington and Lee University and later with a Bachelor of Divinity from Virginia Theological Seminary. He also graduated with a master's degree in urban and regional planning from Florida State University. He was ordained to the priesthood in 1956. He served churches in Tallahassee, Florida and Jacksonville, Florida. In 1974 he became rector of Trinity Church in Martinsburg, West Virginia. He was also a diocesan canon in the Diocese of Florida.

On June 14, 1980, McNutt was elected Coadjutor Bishop of Central Pennsylvania after the forth ballot, during a convention held at Bucknell University. He was consecrated on November 8, 1980 by Presiding Bishop John Allin at the Scottish Rite Cathedral in Harrisburg, Pennsylvania. He succeeded as diocesan bishop on June 12, 1982 during a service in the Rooke Chapel of Bucknell University. The service was presided over by the Presiding Bishop, John Allin. He retired in 1995.

McNutt married Alice Turnbull and has three children.

References

1931 births
Living people
Episcopal bishops of Central Pennsylvania
Religious leaders from Charleston, West Virginia
Episcopalians from West Virginia